Actinoallomurus is a genus in the phylum Actinomycetota (Bacteria).

Etymology
The name Actinoallomurus derives from:Greek noun actis , ray, used to refer to actinomycetes; Greek adjective allos, different; Latin masculine gender noun murus, wall; New Latin masculine gender noun Actinoallomurus, actinomycetes with a different wall.

Species
The genus contains 11 species.
Actinoallomurus spadix was previously known as Actinomadura spadix and with the exception of Actinoallomurus oryzae and Actinoallomurus acaciae, the rest were described in 2009 (Actinoallomurus amamiensis, Actinoallomurus caesius, Actinoallomurus coprocola, Actinoallomurus fulvus, Actinoallomurus iriomotensis, Actinoallomurus luridus, Actinoallomurus purpureus and Actinoallomurus yoronensis)

See also
 Bacterial taxonomy
 Microbiology

References 

Bacteria genera
Actinomycetales